KLEA (95.7 FM) is a radio station broadcasting a classic hits format. Licensed to Hobbs, New Mexico, United States, the station is currently owned by Noalmark Broadcasting Corporation.

Engineering
Chief Engineer is Kenneth S. Fine, CPBE

References

External links

Classic hits radio stations in the United States
LEA (FM)
Noalmark Broadcasting Corporation radio stations
Radio stations established in 1965
1965 establishments in New Mexico